Friedrich Wilhelm Christian Sturm (1810/11 – 23 May 1896) was a notable New Zealand naturalist, interpreter and nursery owner. He was born in Germany or Austria in about 1810. He was an early settler in New Zealand, arriving in 1839 in Napier (then known as Ahuriri).

References

1810s births
1896 deaths
Year of birth uncertain
New Zealand naturalists
Interpreters
19th-century translators
German emigrants to New Zealand